Metzgeriaceae is a family of thallose liverworts in the order Metzgeriales. Species may be either monoicous or dioicous.

Genera
As accepted by GBIF;

Figures in brackets are approx. how many species per genus.

References

External links

Liverwort families
Metzgeriales